The Ministry of Telecommunications and Information Society of the Republic of Serbia was the ministry in the Government of Serbia. The ministry merged into the Ministry of Culture, Information, and Informational Society on 14 March 2011.

History
The Ministry was established on 15 May 2007. Four years layer, on 14 March 2011, the Ministry was merged into the Ministry of Culture, Information, and Informational Society. In 2012, when the Ministry of Internal and Foreign Trade, Telecommunications, and Information Society was reestablished, it took some of the Ministry's former jurisdictions.

List of ministers
Political Party:

External links
 Serbian ministries, etc – Rulers.org

Defunct government ministries of Serbia
2007 establishments in Serbia
Ministries established in 2007
2011 disestablishments in Serbia
Ministries disestablished in 2011